Brekov is a village and municipality in the Humenné District in the Prešov Region of north-east Slovakia.

History
In historical records the village was first mentioned in 1314.

Geography
The municipality lies at an altitude of 145 metres and covers an area of 9.725 km².
It has a population of about 1,265 people.

Landmarks

Situated on a limestone bedrock hill at an altitude of roughly 480 m above sea level, Brekov castle was founded in the late second half of the 13th century. It went through various owners during its history, though the longest ownership was by the Drugeth noble family, residing in nearby Humenné. The castle was damaged in the 1640s and despite some repairs, it was abandoned and fell into ruin after 1684.

Genealogical resources

The records for genealogical research are available at the state archive "Statny Archiv in Presov, Slovakia"

 Roman Catholic church records (births/marriages/deaths): 1713-1940 (parish B)

See also
 List of municipalities and towns in Slovakia

References

External links
 
 
 stats
 Brekov

Villages and municipalities in Humenné District
Zemplín (region)